Tony Gallagher may refer to:

 Tony Gallagher (editor) (born 1963), British newspaper editor
 Tony Gallagher (businessman) (born 1951), British property developer
 Tony Gallagher (footballer) (born 1963), Scottish footballer
 Tony Gallagher (Canadian journalist) (born 1948), Canadian journalist